National Fengshan Senior High school, alias Fengshan Senior High School, abbreviated FSSH or FSHS, is a high school with a long history, marked as one of the schools as trials by  the education ministry in Taiwan that mixed together both sexes in a class since past few decades from now, located in Fongshan District, Kaohsiung City, Taiwan. Important neighboring infrastructures and institutions to the school are  Kaohsiung City Government (Fongshan Administrative Office and formerly Kaohsiung County Government), Taiwanese Presidential Office in southern Taiwan, Fengshan railway station, TRA Jhenyi Chenching Station,  Kaohsiung City Bus Main Station, Fongshan_West_MRT_station, Weiwuying_MRT_station, Kaohsiung Interchange of Freeway 1, Weiwuying Metropolitan Park, National_Kaohsiung_Center_for_the_Arts, therefore, it is within easy reach and a well-known high school in the Kaohsiung_metropolitan_area, which enrolls the number of students graduating from junior high schools that can constitute 18 classes per grade in each school year.

Pets
There are presently many pets fed and raised in Fengshan Senior High School supported by a recently-established club called Pet-serving aimed at taking care of those stray animals and Free-ranging dog who visit the school by chance.

List of the given names for the stray animals 

白襪 (White Sox)

泡泡 (Bubble)

毛毛 (Mao Mao, literally full of fur)

爛爛 (Dirt)

花花 (Flower)

帥哥 (Handsome Guy)

拉屎 (Pooping)

妹妹 (Sister)

小布 (Pudding)

Renowned alumni
Hsueh Hsiang-chuan
Hou Hsiao-hsien
You Ching
Tseng Yung-fu
Yoga Lin
Yao Jen-to

See also
National Fengshan Vocational High School

Reference

High schools in Taiwan
Schools in Kaohsiung
Educational institutions established in 1939
1939 establishments in Taiwan